The Natural and Historical Monuments Act, 1923 was a South African Act creating a Historical Monuments Commission who's members would identity and seek to take ownership of natural and historical monuments so as to preserve them and prevent further impairment. A monument could be defined as land or scenery of distinctive beauty, fauna, flora or objects, have scientific or historical value and also included waterfalls, caves, bushman paintings, trees and buildings.

Content of the Act
The following is a brief description of the sections of the Natural and Historical Monuments Act, 1923:

Definitions and interpretation
Section 1
Defines that the Governor-General establish a commission called the Commission for the Preservation of Natural and Historical Monuments of the Union; of no more than seven members; unpaid duties; a chairman and a deputy chosen by the members with the chairman having a casting vote and the names of the members of the commission would be published in the Government Gazette.
Section 2
Defines the commission as a body corporate and subject to laws that govern such a body.
Section 3
Defines that the funds of the commission can include donations, fees and annual subscriptions. Donations need publishing annually in the Government Gazette.
Section 4
Defines the duties of the commission as establish a register of monuments it believes should be preserved; establish who owns the monument; purchase a monument to preserve or prevent its impairment if funds are available and become a trustee of any monument if requested by a person or gifted or bequeath to the state.
Section 5
Defines the restrictions to the power of what a commission can do as a trustee of a monument.
Section 6
Defines the powers of the Governor-General to make regulations to set procedures for the commission's meetings, the members qualifications, the period they hold office for and other matters required to carry out the commission.
Section 7
Defines the commissions powers to make by-laws, subject to the approval of the Governor-General, such as regulating to access monuments, fix entrance fees and safeguard monuments from damage.
Section 8
Defines what the word monument means in relation to the Act.
Section 9
Defines the short title of the Act.

Reference

1923 in South African law